The miniKORG is a two VCO monophonic analog synthesizer that was released in 1972 from Korg. It featured 37 keys, three ring modulators and built in analogue effects. It has wooden side panels and all the controls for the unit are not on the front panel but on the side facing the player. It was considered to be stable, affordable and sounded great.

Models
The 700S is an enhanced version of the Korg Mini-Korg 700, it has a second oscillator.

Notable users (700 model) 
Daniel Miller ( Depeche Mode prd)
 The Cure

References

Further reading

External links
 http://www.synthfool.com/docs/Korg/Korg_700s_Service_Manual.pdf

Korg synthesizers
Monophonic synthesizers
Analog synthesizers